Glitchers is a British independent video-game company based in Dalston, East London. It was founded in 2013 by Matthew Hyde, Hugo Scott-Slade, and Maxwell Scott-Slade (of Johnny Two Shoes). 
Glitchers is best known for developing Sea Hero Quest in 2016. The game was developed in collaboration with Alzheimer's Research UK to help dementia research by tracking players' 3D navigation.

The company's name was GLITCHE.RS from 2013 to 2016, and the URL glitche.rs redirects to its website.

Games

 Plunderland (2010) is an interactive pirate adventure game for iPhone, released initially as part of Johnny Two Shoes but now developed by Glitchers and is available as part of GameClub
 Chippy (2013), a time management game in a simulated fish and chips shop, Chippy was developed as a self-funded app based game and is now available as part of GameClub. Chippy was well received and described by Pocket Gamer as “addictive stuff, and it’s easy to play”.
 Gumulon (2013) is a mobile app based game promoting Stride chewing gum by requiring the player to chew to activate the game. 
 Kano is an experimental colour-matching arcade game, which Glitchers explain “was designed primarily as an experiment for us to test out assumptions around player retention, payment models and growth hacking.”
 Sea Hero Quest (2016) is a mobile game which contributes to research on dementia by tracking players' 3D navigation It was designed by Glitchers in association with Alzheimer's Research UK, University College London and the University of East Anglia and with funding from Deutsche Telekom. The idea for the game came from neuroscientist Michael Hornberger of the University of East Anglia who collaborated with Hugo Spiers of University College London and a group of six other neuroscientists.
 Cone Wars (2017) is an online multiplayer and PC game featuring Ice cream van turf wars in which teams compete to sell the most ice creams using weapons and tactics.
 Nestlums (2020) is a money training app for children, designed to teach good financial habits using familiar gaming techniques, developed in collaboration with Cauldron.
 Drive Buy (2021) is described as a "short-session multiplayer vehicle combat game with a delivery twist" and is available on Steam and Nintendo Switch

Awards
In 2018 Sea Hero Quest was nominated for a British Academy Games Awards BAFTA in the category: Game Beyond Entertainment, a new category for games which "deliver a transformational experience beyond pure entertainment". 

Also in 2018 Glitchers won a Webby award for Social Impact. 

In 2020 Sea Hero Quest was nominated for the Coney Island Dreamland Award for Best AR/VR Game at the New York Game Awards.

References

External links

Glitchers company information  

Video game companies of the United Kingdom
Video game development companies
Video game companies established in 2013
British companies established in 2013